Uldericus Nardi (1637–1705) was a Roman Catholic prelate who served as Bishop of Bagnoregio (1698–1705).

Biography
Uldericus Nardi was born in Poppi, Italy on 5 May 1637 and ordained a priest on 18 October 1667. On 21 July 1698, he was appointed during the papacy of Pope Innocent XII as Bishop of Bagnoregio. On 25 July 1698, he was consecrated bishop by Emmanuel-Theódose de la Tour d'Auvergne de Bouillon, Cardinal-Bishop of Porto e Santa Rufina, with Francesco Pannocchieschi d'Elci, Archbishop of Pisa, and Prospero Bottini, Titular Archbishop of Myra, serving as co-consecrators. He served as Bishop of Bagnoregio until his death on 17 April 1705.

Episcopal succession
While bishop, Nardi was the principal co-consecrator of:
Giulio Troili, Bishop of Foligno (1698); and
George Witham, Titular Bishop of Marcopolis (1703).

References

External links
 (for Chronology of Bishops) 
 (for Chronology of Bishops) 

17th-century Italian Roman Catholic bishops
18th-century Italian Roman Catholic bishops
Bishops appointed by Pope Innocent XII
1637 births
1705 deaths